This was the first edition of the tournament.

Jason Jung won the title, defeating Rubén Ramírez Hidalgo in the final, 6–4, 6–2.

Seeds

Draw

Finals

Top half

Bottom half

References
Main Draw
Qualifying Draw

Chengdu Challenger - Singles
2016 Singles